Prigat (originally called Gat) is a juice and syrup manufacturer in Israel owned by Gat Foods and Israel Beer Breweries. Prigat's headquarters are located in two kibbutzim, Givat Haim (Meuhad) and Givat Haim (Ichud), near Hadera. Prigat is Israel's second largest manufacturer in the juice industry, with 280 employees as of 2006.

History

Prigat was founded in 1940 when the leaders of the Givat Chaim kibbutz decided to build a factory for canned fruit and vegetable products.
In 1941, the factory was named "Gat" and quickly began the marketing of the company's first products, which were jams, tomato puree and applesauce.
In 1943, the British Army in Palestine ordered 775,000 syrup bottles for 55,000 Palestinian pounds (the local currency at the time of the order). 
Starting from 1947, the company began using mechanical juice extraction based on the FMC citrus juice extractor, which finished developing the same year.
In 1957, Prigat began marketing sweetcorn seeds in tin cans.
In 1958, Golda Meir, who was a foreign minister at the time, approved the "Jaffa Champion" company trademark for marketing outside of Israel.
In 1959, the company's peanut factory was established. The peanut factory was later separated from Prigat's juice activities and is not handled by Prigat today.
In 1962, the company's frozen juice and vegetables department was established.
In 1972, Gat won the best exporter award for 1971.
In 1976, a plastic factory for the 6oz frozen juice and vegetables boxes was established.
In 1977, the "Prigat" trademark was first used referring to the frozen food department of the company.
In 1982, Prigat's production line for juice in small bags was established.
In 1987, Prigat's production line for juice in cardboards was established.
In 1993, Prigat began marketing in Romania.
In 1995, Prigat's production line for squeezed juice was established.

In 2003, Prigat's merge with Israel Beer Breweries was completed, In El Al flights served drinks of Prigat.

International activity

Prigat primarily markets in Israel; however, it contains products and/or exports to 15 other countries as well: Australia, Austria, Belgium, Bulgaria, Canada, Ethiopia, France, Ghana, Hungary,  Kenya, North Macedonia, Romania, South Africa, Spain, United Kingdom and the US. Prigat overseas export revenue is estimated at US$65.5 million as of 2006, 59.5% of their total revenue.

In 2003, Prigat held 37% of the non-carbonated soft drinks market in Romania, according to market research quoted by the company.

Jewish National Fund 

Prigat has also been involved with the non-profit Jewish National Fund. As of 2006, Prigat spent a total of ₪3 million NIS on treeplanting, of which 2 million square metres of orchards were planted in the Negev area. Following the 2006 Israel-Lebanon conflict, Prigat sent the company's employees to restore the Birya forest after numerous Katyushas fell in the area.

See also
Israeli cuisine
Squash (drink)
Limonana

References

External links
Official website of Prigat 
Official website of Gat Foods 
Official website of Prigat international 
Prigat's timeline 

Food and drink companies established in 1940
Food and drink companies of Israel
Israeli brands
Juice brands
1940 establishments in Mandatory Palestine